James F. "Boots" Donnelly (born October 15, 1942) is a former American football player and coach. He served as the head football coach at Austin Peay State University from 1977 to 1978 and at Middle Tennessee State University (MTSU) from 1979 to 1998, compiling a career college football coaching record of 154–94–1. Donnelly was inducted into the Blue Raider Hall of Fame in 1993! He was inducted into the College Football Hall of Fame as a coach in 2013.

Playing career
Donnelly was a defensive back at MTSU; his playing career culminated with an MTSU victory in the 1964 Grantland Rice Bowl.

Coaching career
Donnelly began his coaching career at his alma mater, Father Ryan High School in Nashville, Tennessee. He served as the head football coach there from 1974 to 1975, tallying a mark of 21–2. His 1974 team went 13–0 and won the Tennessee Class AAA title. In 1976 Donnelly joined the football staff at Vanderbilt University, coaching the offensive backfield under head coach, Fred Pancoast. Donnelly went on to be the head coach at Austin Peay for two seasons, and at MTSU for twenty seasons.

Later life
After the conclusion of his coaching career, Donnelly served as athletic director at MTSU for several years. In 2006, he became CEO of Backfield in Motion, an organization dedicated to fostering academic and athletic abilities among inner city youth. In October 2015, a statue of Donnelly was unveiled on the MTSU campus.

Head coaching record

College

References

Further reading

External links
 
 Boots Donnelly photo playing in the 1964 Grantland Rice Bowl
 Backfield in Motion homepage

1942 births
Living people
American football defensive backs
Austin Peay Governors football coaches
Middle Tennessee Blue Raiders athletic directors
Middle Tennessee Blue Raiders football coaches
Middle Tennessee Blue Raiders football players
Vanderbilt Commodores football coaches
High school football coaches in Tennessee
College Football Hall of Fame inductees
Sportspeople from Nashville, Tennessee
Coaches of American football from Tennessee
Players of American football from Nashville, Tennessee